Sir Hormasji Pherozeshah Mody KBE (23 September 1881 – 9 March 1969), generally known as Sir Homi Mody was a noted Parsi businessman associated with Tata Group and an administrator of India.

He started his career as a lawyer at Mumbai and in 1913 became chairman of Bombay Municipal Corporation. In 1920 he joined business and became member of Textile Mill owners' Association of which he became chairman in 1927. His signing of Lees-Mody pact as its chairman was subject of debate in Indian nationalist circle. He joined Tata Group as director in 1939 and served the group till 1959. He also served as director in various companies like – ACC, Tata Hydro, Indian Hotels.

He was director of Central Bank of India till 1968. He with other leaders like Pranlal Devkaran Nanjee played crucial role in the formation of the Indian Banks' Association, which came into existence on 26 September 1946.

He was a member of Indian legislative Assembly for fourteen years from years 1929 to 1943. In 1941 to 1943 he was appointed to the Viceroy's Executive Council with the key portfolio of Supply. He was member of Constituent Assembly of India for years 1948–1949. After independence of India, he was appointed Governor of United Provinces and Uttar Pradesh for the years 1949–52.

He died on 9 March 1969, aged 87.

As an author he wrote books including:- (1) The Political Future of India ; Reflections (1908) (2) Biography of Feroz Shah Mehta(3) Wise and Otherwise.

He was the father of Russi Mody, Piloo Mody and Kali Mody.

Mody was knighted as a Knight Commander of the Order of the British Empire (KBE) in the  1935 Birthday and Silver Jubilee Honours List, and was appointed a Grand Commander of the Order of George I by George II, the King of Greece in 1946 for services during the Second World War. A road in Mumbai is named after him as Sir Homi Mody Street.

References

External links
 

Parsi people from Mumbai
Governors of Uttar Pradesh
Members of the Constituent Assembly of India
Members of the Central Legislative Assembly of India
English-language writers from India
1881 births
1969 deaths
Businesspeople from Mumbai
Tata Group people
Indian Knights Commander of the Order of the British Empire
Grand Commanders of the Order of George I
20th-century Indian businesspeople
Indian political writers
20th-century Indian biographers
Indian bankers
20th-century Indian male writers
Members of the Council of the Governor General of India